Adrián Vázquez Lázara (Madrid, 1982) is a Spanish politician, MEP for Citizens (Ciudadanos), the Spanish political delegation part of Renew Europe (third biggest political group at the European Parliament).

Early life and education 
Born on May 5, 1982, in Madrid, his family roots are in the Galician town of Lalín in northwest Spain (province of Pontevedra). After starting Law studies at the Complutense University of Madrid, Vázquez spent a year in Japan, where he earned a diploma in Japanese Language and Culture Studies from the International Studies Institute in Tokyo. He also has an MA in International Relations from the University of Warwick (United Kingdom) and a Degree in International Relations from Lindenwood University (Missouri, United States), thanks to a sports scholarship.

Professional career 
Since 2015, Vázquez has coordinated Citizens’ international and European activity, as well as the international agenda of the Ciudadanos’ former president, Albert Rivera. Also, together with Luis Garicano, he steered the negotiations that led to the party joining the European liberal family of ALDE (Alliance of Liberals and Democrats for Europe) and, subsequently, to the formation of the Renew Europe group in the European Parliament, a coalition made of all the European liberal parties with the French centrist party La République En Marche!, founded by Emmanuel Macron. He also coordinated Citizens’ 2019 European Parliament elections campaign 

A specialist in international affairs and public administration, between 2015 and 2020, before being elected to his present position, he was chief of staff of the Citizens delegation to the European Parliament. The now MEP had already gained first-hand experience of this institution a year earlier, when he was head of office of the then MEP for UPyD (Union, Progress and Democracy) and Vice President of ALDE, Fernando Maura.

Previously, he worked for various organizations such as the OSCE, specifically for the Secretariat in Vienna and the Mission to Bosnia and Herzegovina; NATO, as a researcher for the Political Committee and the Science and Technology Committee; and the Korea Trade-Investment Promotion Agency. He has also worked as an advisor to former minister for foreign affairs, Ana Palacio, and as a Public Affairs consultant.

Political career 
In 2019 he was designated no. 8 on the list of Citizens candidates for the European Parliament elections on 26 May. As a result of the distribution of seats following the United Kingdom’s exit from the European Union, Vázquez took up his seat as an MEP on 1 February 2020.

On 17 February 2020 he was elected Chair of the European Parliament’s Committee on Legal Affairs. He is also a member of the European Parliament’s Conference of Committee Chairs and the Delegation for Relations with the People’s Republic of China, and a substitute member of the Committee of Agriculture and Rural Development and the Delegation for Relations with Bosnia and Herzegovina, and Kosovo

In September 2022 he was designated spokesperson for Ciudadanos at the European Parliament, replacing Luis Garicano. He is also in charge of the executive coordination for the re-foundation of Ciudadanos and of building a stronger relationship with liberal parties around the EU.

References 

Citizens (Spanish political party) MEPs
Members of the European Parliament for Spain
People from Madrid
MEPs for Spain 2019–2024
Complutense University of Madrid alumni
Alumni of the University of Warwick
Lindenwood University alumni
1982 births
Living people